The 1972–73 Memphis Tams season was the 1st season of the Tams and 3rd overall season of American Basketball Association basketball in Memphis. After two seasons as the Memphis Pros with middling profits, Charles O. Finley bought the team on June 13, 1972. He proceeded to rebrand the team like his other teams that he had owned (the Oakland Athletics and the Oakland Seals), changing the colors of the team to Kelly Green, California Gold, and Polar Bear White. The team's name was picked from an array of 20,000 postcards sent by fans, with the winner being given a $2,500 prize, which turned out to be Tams. Tams was meant to stand for the fans that resided in Tennessee, Arkansas, and Mississippi, with a tam-o-shanter hat being the main logo. In fact during the first ever game on October 12, 1972, the entire team came out wearing the hats. Finley also had a hand in the combinations of uniform colors worn, in part due to there every top and trunk being either green, gold, or white, with one notable combo being yellow tops with white trunks. For all of the flair the team had with uniforms, it did not translate into success on the court nor for attendance. By December, Finley tried to have negotiations to move the team to St. Paul, Minnesota, and Ron Franz was cut before Christmas. The Tams were 6th in points scored at 111.5 per game but were dead last in points allowed at 118.1 per game. They had two instances of 10 game losing streaks, with the Tams going a month between wins, losing 15 straight games from February 25 to March 24. By the time the streak ended, they had been eliminated from making the playoffs. They were the first team to lose 60 games since the Miami Floridians in 1969.

Roster   
 -- Darel Carrier - Shooting guard 
 40 Sam Cash - Power forward 
 -- Bill Chamberlain - Small forward 
 34 Lee Davis - Power forward 
 20 Mike Davis - Shooting guard 
 35 Warren Davis - Small forward 
 32 Randy Denton - Center
 30 Bob Ford - Small forward 
 15 Ronald Franz - Small forward 
 30 Les Hunter - Power forward 
 24 Mervin Jackson - Point guard
 11 Wil Jones - Power forward 
 20 Loyd King - Shooting guard 
 33 Wendell Ladner - Small forward
 22 Dave Lattin - Power forward
 -- George Lehmann - Point guard
 14 Johnny Neumann - Shooting guard
 12 Luther Rackley - Center
 23 George Thompson - Point guard
 10 Charles Williams - Point guard
 10 Isaiah Wilson - Shooting guard

Final standings

Eastern Division

Awards and honors
1973 ABA All-Star Game selection (game played on February 6, 1973) 
 George Thompson

References

External links
 RememberTheABA.com 1972–73 regular season and playoff results
 Memphis Tams page

Memphis Tams
Memphis Tams, 1972-73
Memphis Tams, 1972-73
Basketball in Memphis, Tennessee